Oreton may refer to:
Oreton, Ohio, USA
Oreton, Shropshire, England
 Oreton, a brand name of methyltestosterone

See also
 Orton (disambiguation)